Tippets is a surname. Notable people with the surname include:

Dennis Tippets (born 1938), American politician
John Tippets (born 1952), American politician

See also
Tippett